Demb is a Yiddish surname. The word literally means "oak" in Yiddish. The word was derived from Polish dąb, plural dęby.

References

Jewish surnames
Yiddish-language surnames
Yiddish Polonisms